The Franklin Electric are a Canadian indie folk collective formed by singer-songwriter Jon Matte from Montreal, Quebec, most noted for receiving a Juno Award nomination for Breakthrough Group of the Year at the Juno Awards of 2018. The band's core member is singer and guitarist Jon Matte, with supporting musicians that include Ken Pressé on guitar, Paul Lucyk on bass, and Adam Passalacqua on drums.

History
The Franklin Electric's debut album, This Is How I Let You Down, was self-released in 2013 before being reissued in 2014 by Indica Records. The album was supported with a cross-Canada tour, as well as several dates as an opening act for other bands in Europe. The band created an animated video for the song "The Strongest Man Alive".

The group released a second album, Blue Ceilings in February 2017; the songs are an eclectic mix of folk, pop, and electronic indie pop.  They toured in Canada and Australia in support of the album, and then went on to perform in Germany in April.

Discography
This Is How I Let You Down (2013)
Blue Ceilings (2017)
In Your Head EP  (2019)
In Your Heart EP  (2020)
Never Look Back (2020)
This Time I See It (2021)

References

External links

Canadian folk rock groups
Musical groups from Montreal
Musical groups established in 2013
Canadian indie folk groups
2013 establishments in Quebec